Ali Badshah (full name Syed Ali Mehdi Rizvi Badshah) is a Canadian actor, writer, producer, and director. Badshah is the male lead in the Oscar-nominated feature film drama The Breadwinner. He has written and starred in five televised comedy specials for CBC, CTV, The Comedy Network, MTV and ABC2 Australia.    An observational comedian whose work often draws on his experiences growing up in and around Toronto, Badshah has also written and performed for Video on Trial and was an associate producer for MuchMusic. Badshah created, executive produced, wrote, and starred in CBC's first web comedy series Bloody Immigrants. An alumnus of both The Second City and Yuk Yuk's, he was on the front page of the Toronto Star as one of the Top Ten People in the country – the only actor/comedian to ever appear on their list – and was featured on the Comedy Network's 'Nubian Disciples Special', with Russell Peters and Dave Chappelle, as part of the "next generation of great Canadian comics."

References

External links

Canadian male film actors
Canadian male television actors
Canadian male voice actors
Canadian television writers
Film producers from Ontario
Year of birth missing (living people)
Canadian stand-up comedians
Canadian male actors of Indian descent
Canadian male actors of Pakistani descent
Comedians from Toronto
Film directors from Toronto
Living people
Male actors from Toronto
Writers from Toronto
Canadian male television writers
Canadian male comedians
21st-century Canadian comedians
21st-century Canadian screenwriters
Asian-Canadian filmmakers